Leopoldine is a given name. Notable people with the name include:

Archduchess Maria Leopoldine of Austria-Este (1776–1848), the second wife of Charles Theodore, Elector of Bavaria
Leopoldine Blahetka (1809–1885), Austrian pianist and composer
Léopoldine Hugo (1824–1843), daughter of novelist, poet and dramatist Victor Hugo
Leopoldine Konstantin (1886–1965), Austrian actress
Leopoldine Kulka (1872–1920), Austrian writer and editor
Leopoldine von Sternberg (1733–1809), princess consort of Liechtenstein, married to prince Franz Joseph I, Prince of Liechtenstein
Maria Leopoldine of Anhalt-Dessau (1746–1769), princess of Anhalt-Dessau by birth and by marriage Countess of Lippe-Detmold
Maria Leopoldine of Austria (1632–1649), Holy Roman Empress as the spouse of Ferdinand III, Holy Roman Emperor
Princess Leopoldine of Baden (1837–1903), Princess consort of Hohenlohe-Langenburg

See also
Leopoldine Society, organisation established in Vienna for the purpose of aiding Catholic missions in North America
Leopold (given name)

German feminine given names

it:Leopoldine